Huwaylat is a settlement in Ras Al Khaimah, United Arab Emirates (UAE). A small village in the Wadi Qor, it is the site of three Umm Al Nar period tombs.

References 

Villages in the United Arab Emirates
Populated places in the Emirate of Ras Al Khaimah